Ikongo (formerly: Fort Canot ) is a town in the region of Fitovinany eastern Madagascar. It is approximately 90 km south-east of the provincial capital Fianarantsoa. It has a population of 36,684 inhabitants.

Rivers
The town lies at the Sandrananta River.

Roads
Ikongo is situated on the unpaved National Road 14 between Ifanadiana and Vohipeno.

References

Populated places in Fitovinany